Drilus flavescens is a species of beetles belonging to the family Drilidae.

Distribution
This insect is mainly present in Austria, Belgium, Luxembourg, France, Italy, Spain,  Germany and Switzerland.

Description
Drilus flavescens is one of the most extreme cases of sexual dimorphism in insects. The females of this beetle look like a caterpillar – so called larviform females – completely lacking wings and other adult characters.

They have long comb-shaped antennas, probably utilized for detecting pheromones of females. Head and pronotum are black, while elytra are reddish, quite soft and covered of fine upstanding hairs.

Biology

Adult males of these insects can be encountered on flowers and foliage. Female live on the ground and can be encountered in the shells of snails (frequently Fruticicola fruticum [O. F. Müller, 1774]), feeding on the inhabitants, previously killed with a poisonous bite and sucked up with the help of digestive enzymes.

The eggs are laid in the soil under the litter and the young larvae of this beetle are covered with hairs. They are predators of terrestrial snails. Upon reaching maximum size (about 20 mm) the larva seeks out a snail shell in which to pupate. By clinging to a snail's shell via the suction cup on the terminal segment of the abdomen, the larva then bites the snail, injecting paralyzing venom that liquefies the snail's flesh with digestive enzymes. The flesh of the snail is then soft enough for the larva to burrow through the snail and enter the shell. Once installed, the larva undergoes hypermetamorphosis; the legs are reduced and the hair largely disappears. This secondary larva will overwinter in the snail shell before pupating.

References

External links
 Delta-intkey
  Inra.fr

Beetles of Europe
Beetles described in 1790
Drilidae